Sengamala Theevu is a 1962 Indian Tamil language film directed by S. Rajendran. The film stars M. R. Radha, C. L. Anandan, Rajasree and Pushpalatha.

Plot

Cast 
The following list is compiled from the book Thiraikalanjiyam Part 2 and from the film credits.

Male cast
M. R. Radha
C. L. Anandan
Kallapart Natarajan
V. K. Ramasamy
V. S. Raghavan

Male cast (Contd.)
Stunt Krishnan
K. Kannan
K. R. Rathinam
R. Pakkirisamy
S. V. Ramdas
Kundu Karupaiah,

Female cast
Rajasree
Pushpalatha
S. Kalavathi
T. P. Muthulakshmi
Indra

Production 
The film was produced by M. A. Venu under his own banner M. A. V. Pictures and was directed by S. Rajendran. The story was written by Saaptoor Aiyadurai while the screenplay and dialogues were penned by Salem Natarajan. The film was made at Salem Ratna Studios. Development began as early as 1956 with a largely different cast and crew.

Soundtrack 
Music was composed by K. V. Mahadevan while the lyrics were penned by Chennai Ekalaivan. The songs "Malarai Parithaai Thalaiyil Vaithaai" and "Sindhithaal Sirippu Varum" attained popularity.

References

External links 

1960s action films
1960s Tamil-language films
Films scored by K. V. Mahadevan
Indian action films